Okehampton railway station is a terminus railway station on the Dartmoor line serving the town of Okehampton in Devon, England. The station closed to regular traffic in 1972, but heritage and occasional mainline services ran from 1997 to 2019. Regular railway services resumed in November 2021.

History 

Boat trains carrying passengers from ocean liners calling at Stonehouse Pool, Plymouth and prestige services such as the Atlantic Coast Express and Devon Belle all used the route. 

With the publication of the Beeching Report in 1963, the line to Bude was put forward for closure as was part of the Exeter to Plymouth Line which was to be cut back to Okehampton. The local press were surprised at this decision, since many small towns had their railway services cut, yet Okehampton survived with a population under 4,000. Its survival prompted questions as to why the line should remain open when others, such as the Avocet Line which saw far more traffic, were proposed for closure. It was said that at the time Okehampton had about 50 regular users per day and a handful of season ticket holders.

The Avocet Line was saved from closure, but Okehampton lost its passenger services from 1972. The line survived, however, for the purposes of freight thanks to the activities of the British Rail ballast quarry at Meldon, three miles from Okehampton, which had an output of 300,000 tons per year. The line to the quarry closed in 2011.

Stationmasters

William Hodge 1871 - 1898 (formerly station master at North Tawton)
Frank Russell 1898 – 1902 (formerly station master at Halwill Junction, afterward stationmaster at Eastleigh)
J. B. Lodder 1902 – 1905 (afterward station master at Launceston)
Walter Hinde until 1909 (afterward station master at Ilfracombe)
Edwin Charles Watkins 1909 – 1919 (formerly station master at Barnstaple, afterward station master at Padstow)
F. S. Stretch 1919 – 1921 (formerly station master at Padstow, afterward station master at Sidmouth)
Frederick Brazier 1921 – 1926 (afterward station master at Wadebridge)
Mr. Phillips 1926 – 1929
Mr Whitford 1929 – 1933
E. E. Northcott 1933 – 1934
Percy C. Hayman 1934 – 1940 (afterward station master at Templecombe)
H. Pengelly 1940 – 1945 (afterward station master at Exeter Central)

1997 to 2019 

As part of a local partnership scheme initiated and led by Devon County Council, Okehampton station was re-opened in 1997 and a youth hostel was opened in the old goods shed, providing an activity centre as well. A summer Sunday service from Exeter to Okehampton operated as part of the Dartmoor Sunday Rover network.

The station building, which was used by Devon Training for Skills after 1972, was restored and reopened incorporating an independently owned model shop and café. After temporary closure during a change in railway ownership in 2008, the cafe was reopened by the Friends of Dartmoor Railway but closed in 2019. A craft centre previously operated on one of the platforms. This now houses a small exhibition and museum showing the history of the railway and station.

British American Railway Services, a new company created by Iowa Pacific Holdings of Chicago, became the owner of the Dartmoor Railway on 4 September 2008. The company said it would develop freight, passenger and tourist services on the railway. This was never achieved. The last heritage service operated on 24 December 2019.

2021 reopening  
In November 2017, the government included the reopening of the line from Exeter to Okehampton as part of its plans to expand the network. Chris Grayling, the secretary of state for transport, wrote to local MPs in January 2018 to inform them of the details. 

In January 2020, British American Railway Services announced that due to financial problems, it intended to sell all its British operations, including the Dartmoor Railway. The United Kingdom government's November 2020 Spending Review included a commitment to restore passenger services and £40 million was allocated for reopening the Dartmoor line in the March 2021 government budget.

It was announced on 19 March 2021 that Okehampton station would reopen with regular services by the end of the year, funded as part of the government's Restoring Your Railway programme. Ownership of the northern half (platform 3) of the station was transferred from Devon County Council to Network Rail in July 2021 for £1. The council retains control of the rest of the station (platforms 1 and 2) and is responsible for maintenance of the footbridge. The station and the line reopened on 20 November 2021 with a train every two hours and was increased to hourly in May 2022.

Facilities 
Although Okehampton is not a staffed station it has a ticket machine, help point, public address system, information screens, CCTV and WiFi. In May 2021, GWR said they would work with the local community to add new facilities including a cafe, Dartmoor National Park visitor centre, a shop, and toilets.

Services 

All services at Okehampton are operated by Great Western Railway.

Future 
Both Railfuture and Anthony Steen (who was MP for Totnes at the time) have proposed the reinstatement of the line between Okehampton and Bere Alston, thereby reconnecting the station with Plymouth. The reopening of the link would restore the continuous circuit of railway linking the towns around Dartmoor. On 18 March 2008, Devon County Council backed a separate proposal by developers Kilbride Community Rail to construct 750 houses in Tavistock that included reopening part of this route from Bere Alston to a new railway station in Tavistock.

The line's reopening would provide an alternative route to Plymouth and the Cornish Main Line in the event of engineering work or storms on the sea wall near Dawlish, although that would entail a reversal by GWR trains at Exeter St Davids and at Plymouth for all trains continuing to Cornwall. Reopening the line would also maintain rail links in the long-term should the line around Dawlish succumb to the sea, as it did on 5 February 2014.

Connections
The Devon Coast to Coast Cycleway Route 27 created by Sustrans passes the station.

A dedicated service 118 rail link bus service links Okehampton station with the town centre and Tavistock. It is timed to connect with train services at the station.

References
Citations

Sources

External links

Dartmoor Line website
Dartmoor Railway Association website

Railway stations in Devon
Heritage railway stations in Devon
Former London and South Western Railway stations
Railway stations in Great Britain opened in 1871
Railway stations in Great Britain closed in 1972
Railway stations in Great Britain opened in 1997
Railway stations in Great Britain closed in 2019
Railway stations in Great Britain opened in 2021
Railway stations served by Great Western Railway
Privately owned railway stations in the United Kingdom
Railway Station
Railway stations opened by Network Rail